Syed Nadir Ali Shah, (1897 - 8 October 1974)  (Sindhi: سيد نادر علي شاهه, Urdu: سید نادر علی شاہ) popularly known as Murshid Nadir Ali Shah, was a Sufi saint of the Qalandariyya sufi order of Islam, Muslim preacher, ascetic, mystic, philanthropist and humanitarian. He was born in Gandaf in the north-west of the Indian subcontinent and eventually ended up settling in Sehwan Sharif, Sindh. He was a spiritual descendant of the famous Sufi saint Lal Shahbaz Qalandar, in Sehwan Sharif. Nadir Ali Shah's legacy rests primarily on his having been one of the most notable figures among saints of Qalandariyya Sufi order with regard to the Islamic preaching, mysticism and asceticism. Additionally he is believed to have contributed significantly to the promotion of human welfare and social uplift of the underprivileged as one of the essential features of the teachings of Qalandariyya sufi order of Islam. He was also custodian of the shrine of the Sufi saint Abdullah Shah Ghazi in Karachi.

Early life 
He was born in Gandaf, District Swabi in 1897 to a Pashtun Syed family. He received his early education from his father Syed Ghulam Shah. He was young when his father died.

Quest for a murshid 
In his early youth, he obtained permission from his mother and embarked on a long journey of finding a murshid (spiritual guide) for himself. He travelled for years and covered the whole Indian subcontinent, seeking knowledge from saints and scholars in Lahore, Sirhind Sharif, Delhi, Ajmer and Quetta before finally settling in Sehwan Sharif. During his stay in Quetta, he had recurring dreams of seeing Lal Shahbaz Qalandar, directing him to reach Sehwan Sharif as early as possible. 

And then it was in Sehwan Sharif, at the sufi centre, near the Shrine of Lal Shahbaz Qalandar, that he finally met his murshid (spiritual mentor), who he had been searching for and who was to have the greatest influence on his life, Deedar Ali Shah. Murshid Deedar Ali Shah, who was the then successor of the Qalandariyya sufi order and custodian of the Sufi centre named Kafi Sakhi Sarwar, greeted him warmly, since the former was already anticipating and eagerly awaiting his arrival that day. Nadir Ali Shah then formally pledged his allegiance to his spiritual teacher, who later on appointed him as his successor. Hence, after Deedar Ali Shah's death in 1931, Nadir Ali Shah became the custodian, taking the name of Murshid Nadir Ali Shah.

Self-restraint 
He chose an extremely ascetic life, spending much of his time meditating, praying and remembering God. He gave up solid food altogether, early in his life. In 1946, Indian mystic Meher Baba went to Sehwan Sharif to meet him. He called him "an advanced pilgrim". According to him Nadir Ali Shah stood in a ditch for a period of two years. He would take only liquid diet. He would wear faqirs' clothes and a Qalandari cap (a cotton cap with flaps over the ears). Nadir Ali Shah kept fasting for fifty consecutive years. During all these years, he fasted all day and prayed all night. He would sit for hours at night with raised hands in dua, or supplication to God.

As a Sufi Master 
Nadir Ali Shah was the most distinguished disciple of Murshid Deedar Ali Shah, who belonged to the Qalandariyya sufi order of Islam, attributed to Lal Shahbaz Qalandar. Deedar Ali Shah was the then custodian of the sufi khanqah, named Kafi Sakhi Sarwar, in Sehwan Sharif. After Deedar Ali Shah's death in 1931, Nadir Ali Shah became the murshid (spiritual leader) of this Sufi order. He held this position for 43 years until his death in 1974. His life was described as one of service to mankind through ethical, spiritual, and practical physical philosophy in action. As a murshid, he inspired a large number of people to reform their lives, and many of them gained eminence for their devotion to God and service to humanity, which included feeding the poor and hungry. Like his predecessors, Murshid Nadir Ali Shah was called the Ruler of The Brotherhood. He was succeeded after his death by Murshid Arif Ali Shah in 1974. British author and Literature Nobel Laureate V. S. Naipaul, during his trip to Pakistan in 1979, visited the Sufi centre of Nadir Ali Shah in Sehwan Sharif and recognised the community of his disciples as a group of friendly, delighted people with brightness in their eyes, who "knew they served the poor and God". They had chosen a "life of sacrifice and service". Many of his disciples attained spiritual heights.

Syed Nadir Ali Shah was also custodian of the shrine of the two grandsons of Abdul Qadir Gilani. The shrine of Mahmood ibn Abdul Razzaq Gilani and Ahmed ibn Abdul Razzaq Gilani is located in the west of the Sehwan city, also called Pir Pota Mazar or Dargah Masoom Pak. A large number of people attend the annual congregation, or urs, which is held every year in their remembrance on the 10th of Rabi' al-Thani.

Nadir Ali Shah was also custodian of the shrine of the 8th-century sufi saint Abdullah Shah Ghazi, located in Karachi. The shrine of Abdullah Shah Ghazi was built, expanded, and beautified during his era in the mid-20th century. He built the iconic green and white striped dome of the shrine (used to be visible from miles away and became the emblem of the city), and the windowed ambulatory, the mosque, the free kitchens or langar khana, the qawwali hall or court, and the guest house on its premises as well as the long stairway leading to the shrine, which was located on the top of a sandy hill. A devotional connection has always been observed between the shrine of Abdullah Shah Ghazi in Karachi and Syed Nadir Ali Shah's Sufi order in Sehwan Sharif.

The Dervish Lodge 
Location

Located just a short walk from the Qalandar's shrine in Sehwan Sharif, it is an ancient spiritual institution and abode for the dervishes of the Qalandariyya sufi order of Islam. It is commonly called as Kafi.

Etymology

Kafi is referred to as a Khanqah, or a teaching and dwelling place for the dervishes of the Qalandariyya sufi order. Other names of this dervish lodge are Kafi of Murshid Nadir Ali Shah and Kafi Sakhi Sarwar (due to the vicinal worship place of 12th-century sufi saint Sultan Sakhi Sarwar).

History

The Kafi is as old as the era of Lal Shahbaz Qalandar. The custodian of Kafi is called murshid (spiritual guide) and the disciples are called malangs (dervishes) and sawalis (aspirants). The murshid traces his spiritual descent from Lal Shahbaz Qalandar. The malangs are well organised and devoted to their cause. As of  the1980s, their number was over two hundred and fifty, some of whom were in the service of the shrine of Abdullah Shah Ghazi and some of the other shrines as well. Among them were highly educated and well-to-do people, who had chosen a "life of sacrifice and service". Hundreds of thousands of followers are affiliated with the sufi order across the globe.

The shrines of the previous ten murshids are inside the premises. They are held in high regard for their services and hence "became rulers or governors of the brotherhood". Murshid Nadir Ali Shah died in 1974, at the age of seventy-seven. He was succeeded by Murshid Arif Ali Shah, a certified MBBS doctor. He was the most distinguished disciple of Nadir Ali Shah, so the throne and the crown were handed over to him shortly after the death of his predecessor. Murshid Arif Ali Shah died in 2022, at the age of seventy-nine.

Teachings

The Qalandari Tariqa, or sufi order, proposes struggle with the self, purification of the heart and feeding of the soul. This is accomplished with prayers and remembrance, along with khidmat (service to humanity).

Services

The Kafi works as a spiritual institution, where spiritual education and training of Qalandar's devotees have been going on for more than seven hundred years. For centuries, the Kafi had the honor of caretaking of the sacred shrine of Lal Shahbaz Qalandar, which also included keeping the shrine in good repair. It also had the privilege of supplying free food and water to the pilgrims and visitors who came to Sehwan Sharif.

After Murshid Deedar Ali Shah's death in 1931, his spiritual successor, Murshid Nadir Ali Shah assumed the charge of the Kafi, as well as the privilege and right of the repair of the sacred Shrine of Lal Shahbaz Qalandar and the provision of food and water to the pilgrims. He held this prestigious office for forty three years. He was known for his wisdom, simplicity, patience, compassion, generosity and hospitality. He worked throughout his life for the alleviation of hunger and started the "free food and water program". He then expanded it, first to all the poor population of the town and its suburbs, and then to Karachi and other cities. His successor, Murshid Arif Ali Shah, not only continued his charitable work, but also significantly developed and expanded it. For decades, the Kafi has been serving a nutritional meal thrice a day to thousands of people daily. Among the daily routine work of the dervishes, besides observing prayers and the all-night remembrance of God, was the hard work and toil with which they managed the Kafi and arranged the food and water for the pilgrims and the poor population of the town and its suburbs. According to Ali Ahmed Brohi, a notable writer and scholar, this service continued throughout the year. According to him, in the deadly heat of Sehwan, kneading thirty maunds (1200 kilograms) of flour and feeding bread to a large number of people daily was such a difficult task, that only the Qalandar's devoted malangs had the courage to undertake it. Provision of water was no easy task at that time, as it involved drawing water from the river Indus, a few miles away from the centre of the town, filling it in large leather bags, loading it onto bullocks, trekking it back, through some of the hottest weathers in the world, and then filling the leather cisterns and earthenware vessels in the sacred Shrine of Lal Shahbaz Qalandar and the Dervish Lodge. Nadir Ali Shah also built a pilgrim hostel for the travellers. He was honoured and held in high esteem by the people.

To the north of the dervish lodge is Kafi Sakhi Sarwar, named after the 12th-century sufi saint Sultan Sakhi Sarwar, who worshipped here for forty days and pleaded in the Divine Court for a perpetual langar (free food service), which was approved. Once, a well-wisher drew the attention of Murshid Nadir Ali Shah to the rising cost of wheat, reaching above fifty rupees a maund, and gave a suggestion for its early purchase that year. Murshid beamed a smiled and replied that "this free food service is for the sake of Allah, hence He shall provide means for it. Rest assured that this service shall continue till the Day of Judgment, even if a grain of wheat costs as much as fifty rupees,".

Teachings and Impact 
Being a murshid of the Qalandariyya sufi order of Islam, Nadir Ali Shah emphasized devotion to God, seeking of knowledge, tawakkul, sabr, purity, humility, brotherhood, forgiveness, and khidmat (service to humanity). He called for fulfilling the spiritual, emotional, and physical needs of people in crisis. His teachings influenced a large number of people across the globe.

Philanthropy 
Murshid Nadir Ali Shah remarkably expanded the volunteer work of his dervish lodge. He gave the vision of free access for all the underprivileged sections of society to quality food, healthcare, education, shelter, safe water, and sanitation to ensure their social and economic uplift. He emphasized feeding the hungry to help people's lives for the better. He underscored that the guarantee of a nutritious meal twice a day will give the children and youth a chance to get education and will give them hope for a better, brighter future. Similarly, food security will help the labourers and other low to middle income families, save their money for health and other needs, hence their improved spiritual, social, and emotional well being. In the 1930s, he laid the foundation of a volunteer organisation for the alleviation of hunger and malnutrition. For this purpose, he started a langar khana (free meal service program) in Sehwan Sharif, for the pilgrims as well as the general public. In addition to fighting against malnutrition and hunger, the programme was also intended to combat age, gender, and socioeconomic inequalities in access to food. This langar khana continues to serve free food to thousands of men, women, and children daily.

He also expanded the free meal service program to the shrine of Abdullah Shah Ghazi in Karachi.

Herbal Medicine 
Nadir Ali Shah was an expert physician in herbal medicine. People from faraway places would come and seek treatment from him.

Spiritual Lineage 
As with any other major sufi order, the Qalandariyya proposes a silsila (an unbroken spiritual chain) of transmitted knowledge, going back to the Islamic Prophet Muhammad through one of his companions, who in the Qalandariyya case is Ali (d. 661).

Thus, Nadir Ali Shah's spiritual lineage is traditionally given as follow:

 Murshid Nadir Ali Shah (d. 1974), "taught by"
 Murshid Deedar Ali Shah (d. 1931), "taught by"
 Murshid Shamsher Ali Shah (d.1926), "taught by"
 Murshid Qutub Ali Shah (d. 1914), "taught by"
 Murshid Mehboob Ali Shah (d. 1900), "taught by"
 Murshid Khaki Shah (d. 1869), "taught by"
 Murshid Aman Ali Shah (d. 1853), "taught by"
 Murshid Darbar Ali Shah (d. 1841), "taught by"
 Murshid Roshan Ali Shah (d. 1826).

This uninterrupted chain is traced back to Prophet Muhammad via Lal Shahbaz Qalandar and Ali.

Death and Burial 
Nadir Ali Shah died in the early hours of Tuesday, October 8, 1974 (21st Ramadan 1394 AH) at the age of 77 years. His funeral prayer was held in the Shrine of Lal Shahbaz Qalandar and was attended by a large number of people. The funeral prayer was led by Qazi Muhammad Murad. He was laid to rest alongside his spiritual mentor, Murshid Deedar Ali Shah in Sehwan Sharif.

Legacy 
Murshid Nadir Ali Shah was succeeded after his death by Murshid Arif Ali Shah in 1974.

Murshid Arif Ali Shah died in 2022, at the age of seventy-nine.

He left behind hundreds of thousands of followers in Pakistan and across the world, who are known for their devotion to God and service to humanity.

The Langar khana (free food facility) of Nadir Ali Shah is located in the dervish lodge of Nadir Ali Shah, also called Kafi in Sehwan Sharif. This charity center, provides meal to thousands of men, women, and children daily and virtually feeds the entire poor population of the town as well as the travelers. Dozens of malangs (devotees) participate in preparing and distributing the food on a regular basis. Several free drinking water Sebils have been set up in Sehwan Sharif by the devotees of Nadir Ali Shah, where cold water is freely dispensed to thousands of people daily.

Apart from this, the centre also provides free accommodation to travellers in the travellers' lodge.

In Poetry and Prose 
Famous poets of Pakistan, in different periods, have paid homage and expressed their love for Murshid Nadir Ali Shah by writing and saying numerous qasidas (panegyrics) and manqabats (devotional poems) in national and regional languages such as Urdu, Sindhi, Punjabi, Balochi, and Pashto. Noor Jehan, Shaukat Ali, Ahmed Khan, and Khyal Muhammad are among the singers who have commemorated and paid tribute to him in their Qawwalis.

EMI Pakistan released an album of devotional songs in his remembrance, titled "Qawwali Hazrat Syed Nadir Ali Shah" on his 40th death anniversary.

Shrine 
The Dargah (shrine) of Nadir Ali Shah is located in the dervish lodge of Nadir Ali Shah, which is situated southeast of the Shrine of Lal Shahbaz Qalandar. The iconic white and green dome is made of ceramic tiles. The hemispherical dome rests on the square building, the corners of which are decorated with four minarets, made of mosaic ceramic tilework. The walls of the shrine are also covered from outside by the same mosaic tilework, making horizontal lines of white, red, green, yellow, blue, and black ceramic tiles, from top to bottom, giving an expression of pure delight. In the interior delicate glasswork adorns the lofty ceiling and the dome. The walls are decorated from the inside with turquoise ceramic tiles and delicate glass work. Quranic verses have been carved in the glasswork on the northern wall. A large number of people visit the shrine daily and pay tribute to Nadir Ali Shah.

Before his death in 1974, Nadir Ali Shah appointed his disciple and nephew, Dr Syed Muhammad Arif Shah, as his successor.

References 

1897 births
1974 deaths
 Indian Muslims
20th-century Islamic religious leaders
Indian Islamic religious leaders
Pakistani Islamic religious leaders
Sufism in Asia
Sufism in India
Sufism in Pakistan
Indian Sufi saints
Pakistani Sufi saints
Pashtun Sufi saints
Sindhi Sufi saints
Sufi mystics
Sufi shrines in Pakistan
Pakistani social workers
Pakistani humanitarians
Pakistani philanthropists